Sangeeta Balwant is an Indian politician from the Bhartiya Janata Party.Balwant contested the Uttar Pradesh Legislative Assembly election held in 2017 and was elected from the Ghazipur Sadar assembly constituency. She is known as grass-rooted political leader.

Early life
Sangeeta was born in Ghazipur City. She got her education in the city and started taking part in political activities of Bahujan Samaj Party. However, with the influence of BJP leader Manoj Sinha, she joined Bhartiya Janata Party.

Posts held

See also
Uttar Pradesh Legislative Assembly

References

Politicians from Ghazipur
Bharatiya Janata Party politicians from Uttar Pradesh
Living people
Uttar Pradesh MLAs 2017–2022
1978 births